Jwala Kumar and the Gift of Fire: Adventures in Champakbagh is Indian author Hansda Sowvendra Shekhar’s first book for children. It is a novel and its reading level is age 9 years and above. This book features illustrations by Krishna Bala Shenoi. It was shortlisted for a 2019 Neev Book Award in the category Junior Readers and a 2019 Crossword Book Award in the children’s books category. One positive review has called this book "a must-read for the young to ask questions and to observe the differences in childhoods across India." In the year 2021, this book was reissued with a new title, Jwala Kumar and the Gift of Fire: The Dragon who came to Champakbagh.

References

2018 novels
Indian children's novels
Speaking Tiger books